Agnes Magnúsdóttir (27 October 1795 – 12 January 1830) was the last person to be executed in Iceland, along with Friðrik Sigurðsson. The pair were sentenced to death for the murder of Nathan Ketilsson, a farmer in Illugastaðir in Vatnsnes, and Pétur Jónsson from Geitaskarð on 14 March 1828. They were executed by beheading in Vatnsdalshólar in Austur-Húnavatnssýsla on 12 January 1830.

History 

Agnes had been described as an intelligent, imaginative and talented woman. Her appearance is disputed, but one source says she is "not visible", while another describes her as more complete and fun in her approach. Agnes was in her thirties and worked as a maid at Geitaskarð when she met Natan Ketilsson. At the same time they were attracted to each other and Agnes was hired at Illugastaðir for the next few days. Agnes no doubt hoped to become Natan's housekeeper and wife, but when he got there it turned out not to be. Natan had chosen Sigríður Guðmundsdóttir as housekeeper, but she was only 16 years old. Friðrik Sigurðsson liked Sigríður, and Agnes probably hoped that she would choose Friðrik and Natan would then choose her. That did not happen, however.

The murder 
On the evening of March 13, 1828, Friðrik came to Illugastaður and had the two maids, Agnes and Sigríði, hide in a barn until Natan and Pétur Jónsson, who was a night visitor to the farm, were asleep. When the men were asleep, Agnes and Friðrik went into the bathroom where the two men were sleeping and Friðrik killed them both with a knife. It is not known whether Sigríður took part in the murder itself, but before Friðrik and Agnes set the bathroom on fire, she stole what was considered valuable. On the night of March 14, local people woke up in the town of Stapakoti in Vatnsneswhen Agnes was there with news. She said that Illugastaðir was engulfed in light flames and that the owner of the farm, Natan, was burned inside together with Pétur Jónsson. But when the fire was put out and the bodies were found, it turned out that it was not an accident.

Execution 
The axe blade used to behead Agnes is on display at the National Museum of Iceland.

In media 
Agnes was the subject of the 1995 Icelandic film Agnes by Egill Eðvarðsson and novel, Burial Rites by Australian writer Hannah Kent (May 2013). In 2017, it was announced that Jennifer Lawrence would play the role of Agnes in the film adaptation of Burial Rites, directed by Luca Guadagnino.

See also 
 List of most recent executions by jurisdiction

References

Bibliography 
 

 

 

1795 births
1830 deaths
Executed Icelandic people
People executed for murder
People convicted of murder by Denmark
People executed by Denmark by decapitation
18th-century Icelandic women
19th-century Icelandic women